All Saints Episcopal School may refer to:

 All Saints Episcopal School (Lubbock, Texas)
 All Saints Episcopal School (Tyler, Texas)